Clifford George Celaire is a Dominica professional manager.

In 1996 and 2005–2006 he was a head coach of the Dominica national football team. Until July 2012 he worked as General Secretary of the Dominica Football Association

References

Year of birth missing (living people)
Living people
Dominica football managers
Dominica national football team managers
Place of birth missing (living people)